Phyllis Jean Hamilton (born 1952) is a Senior United States district judge of the United States District Court for the Northern District of California.

Education and career

Born in Jacksonville, Illinois, Hamilton received a Bachelor of Arts degree from Stanford University in 1974 and a Juris Doctor from Santa Clara University School of Law in 1976. She was a deputy public defender in the California Office of the Public Defender from 1976 to 1980, and briefly served as a manager of EEO Programs for Farinon Electric Corporation in 1980. She became an administrative judge for the San Francisco Regional Office of the United States Merit Systems Protection Board from 1980 to 1985, and was a court commissioner for the Municipal Court, Oakland-Piedmont-Emeryville Judicial District from 1985 to 1991. From 1991 to 2000, Hamilton was a United States magistrate judge of the United States District Court for the Northern District of California.

Federal judicial service

On February 9, 2000, Hamilton was nominated by President Bill Clinton to a new seat on the United States District Court for the Northern District of California created by 104 Stat. 5089. She was confirmed by the United States Senate on May 24, 2000, and received her commission on May 25, 2000. She served as Chief Judge from December 17, 2014 until February 1, 2021 when she assumed senior status.

See also 
 List of African-American federal judges
 List of African-American jurists
 List of first women lawyers and judges in California

References

Sources

Confirmation hearings on federal appointments : hearings before the Committee on the Judiciary, United States Senate, One Hundred Sixth Congress, first session, on confirmation of appointees to the federal judiciary. pt.2 (1999) 

1952 births
Living people
African-American judges
Judges of the United States District Court for the Northern District of California
United States district court judges appointed by Bill Clinton
Stanford University alumni
Santa Clara University alumni
Santa Clara University School of Law alumni
United States magistrate judges
People from Jacksonville, Illinois
20th-century American judges
21st-century American judges
20th-century American women judges
21st-century American women judges
Public defenders